Mattia Binotto (born 3 November 1969) is a Swiss-born Italian engineer and the former team principal of Scuderia Ferrari in Formula One. He was appointed to the role on 7 January 2019, replacing Maurizio Arrivabene. His parents are Italian.

Career

Born in Lausanne, Binotto obtained a bachelor's degree in mechanical engineering at the École Polytechnique Fédérale de Lausanne in 1994 and then a master's in motor vehicle engineering at the University of Modena and Reggio Emilia. In 1995, he joined Scuderia Ferrari in the engine department. He was part of the team during the successful early 2000s. In 2013, he became head of the engine department, before becoming chief technical officer (CTO) of Ferrari in July 2016, replacing James Allison. During Binotto's two years as CTO, Ferrari once more competed for regular race wins. In 2019, he was promoted to team principal, replacing Maurizio Arrivabene. In November 2022, he announced his resignation from the role; he left the role on 31 December 2022.

References

1969 births
Living people
École Polytechnique Fédérale de Lausanne alumni
University of Modena alumni
Ferrari people
Italian motorsport people
Formula One team principals
Formula One engine engineers
Sportspeople from Lausanne
Italian automotive engineers